Following the first election that was held after the 2007 municipal reform, Martin Damm from Venstre had been mayor of Kalundborg Municipality. 

The traditional blue bloc had won 16 seats in 2017, 2 more than needed for a majority. For this election, Martin Damm would seek his 4th term.

In the result Venstre would once again become the largest party, with a majority of 9%. New Right would become the third largest party in terms of votes. It was the only municipality in the 2017 Danish local elections where they managed to finish in the top 3. The blue bloc had won 15 seats. It was later announced that Martin Damm would continue.

Electoral system
For elections to Danish municipalities, a number varying from 9 to 31 are chosen to be elected to the municipal council. The seats are then allocated using the D'Hondt method and a closed list proportional representation.
Kalundborg Municipality had 27 seats in 2021

Unlike in Danish General Elections, in elections to municipal councils, electoral alliances are allowed.

Electoral alliances  

Electoral Alliance 1

Electoral Alliance 2

Electoral Alliance 3

Results

Notes

References 

Kalundborg